Páirc Esler (also  ) is a GAA stadium in Newry, County Down, Northern Ireland. It is the home of the Down Gaelic football and hurling teams and the Newry Shamrocks GAA club. The ground has a capacity of about 20,000.

History
The ground was named after Fr. (later Archdeacon) Hugh Esler (d. 1983), a Catholic priest and Ballynahinch native credited with reinvigorating interest in Gaelic football in Newry in the 1930s–50s, and with securing the grounds that was to later become Páirc Esler.

Renovation
The ground has undergone major redevelopment work, with new stands, floodlights, new pitch all added in 2006–2007. From 1999 to 2004 no senior intercounty championship matches were played at the venue. After the development of a new terrace at the canal end of the ground and a new stand on the south side of the ground, Down hosted the All Ireland Champions, Tyrone, in round 2 of the football championship qualifiers. The following year both Fermanagh and Derry visited the ground in the qualifiers, Down losing to the latter. The ground was closed after the Down v Armagh game in Division 1B of the National Football League in March 2006 for further development.

Reopening

With work now completed on the ground, with a new covered stand and floodlighting facilities, the ground hosted its first Ulster Senior Football Championship Match since 1999 when Cavan visited the stadium for a preliminary round replay on Sunday 20 May 2007, which the home side won 0–15 to 0–11. In June it held a first-round Ulster Championship clash with Monaghan and a first-round qualifier game with Meath – Down lost both games.

On 8 October 2007, the new stand was officially opened by GAA president Nickey Brennan, just before the start of the Senior Football Championship Final between Mayobridge and Longstone, which ended in a draw.  Mayobridge won the replay, and their fourth title in a row.  The 26 October saw the official switch-on of the floodlights, which was marked by the division one league final between Kilcoo and An Riocht.  An Riocht won the game by 3 points, with AFL star Martin Clarke scoring 2–1 in the final. It has now hosted Dr. McKenna cup matches in 2008 in which Down played and beat Cavan, UUJ and beat Donegal 5–14 to 0–13. In the same year they won the final which was played in Casement Park, Belfast. Down V Derry, and later in the championship first round beat soon-to-be All Ireland SFC Champions Tyrone, the only team that year to do so in the championship.

See also
 List of Gaelic Athletic Association stadiums
 List of stadiums in Ireland by capacity

References

Down GAA
Gaelic games grounds in Northern Ireland
Newry
Sports venues in County Down